Tomlinson is an unincorporated community in Champaign County, Illinois, United States. Tomlinson is located along a railroad line west of Rantoul.

References

Unincorporated communities in Champaign County, Illinois
Unincorporated communities in Illinois